Hamish Macbeth is a Scottish mystery comedy-drama television series produced by BBC Scotland that aired from 26 March 1995 to 4 May 1997. It is loosely based on a series of mystery novels by M. C. Beaton (Marion Chesney). The series concerns a local police officer, Constable Hamish Macbeth, in the fictitious town of Lochdubh on the west coast of Scotland. The title character was played by Robert Carlyle. It consisted of three series, with the first two series containing six episodes and the third containing eight.

The series was released on DVD in the United Kingdom and the United States in 2005 and 2006, respectively, with the exception of the first series episode "West Coast Story". This was due to rights issues surrounding the episode's extensive use of excerpts from the 1961 film West Side Story.

Synopsis
Hamish Macbeth, a police constable in the Northern Constabulary, accompanied by his dog, a West Highland Terrier named Wee Jock (later another West Highland Terrier called Jock following Wee Jock's death), keeps the peace in the small town of Lochdubh (pronounced with the guttural 'ch' sound, LoCH-DOO).  Macbeth does this in his own way, without undue reliance on the letter of the law and with every intention of avoiding being promoted out of what is his ideal job. He strongly dislikes involvement from Inverness police, and sometimes his main work doesn't seem to be the capture of local very petty criminals, but to keep them away from prison and penalties.

The major running theme of the series is the tension caused by Hamish's attraction to both the journalist of the local newspaper, Isobel Sutherland and the aristocratic author Alexandra Maclean. Other themes include the clairvoyance of Hamish's friend and co-worker "TV John", John McIver, the not-so-secret romance between the school-teacher Esme Murray and the shopkeeper Rory Campbell, the volatile marriage of the publican Barney Meldrum and his wife Agnes, the schemes of the two Lachie MacCraes, father and son, the laid-back, pipe smoking Doc Brown, and Major Peregrine Maclean, father of Alexandra and aristocratic penniless widower.

The series was accompanied by the Gaelic music of John Lunn.

Production
The series was filmed on location in the village of Plockton, the town of Kyle of Lochalsh and the surrounding area. A map of the Lochdubh area shown in the episode "In Search of a Rose" places Lochdubh close to Toscaig, just to the north of Kyle of Lochalsh, with Lochdubh Island being part of the Crowlin Islands.

The series was directed mainly by Nicholas Renton, with Mandie Fletcher directing four episodes and Jonas Grimas directing two episodes in 1997.

Cast
 Robert Carlyle as PC Hamish Macbeth; A policeman in the village of Lochdubh, laid-back in dealing with the inhabitants' quirky ways. He works to avoid promotion or transfer, and is clearly more interested in keeping the peace than enforcing the letter of the law.
 Ralph Riach as John James McIver (pronounced "Mc-Eever"), AKA "TV John"; Hamish's friend and confidant who got his nickname because he was the first man in Lochdubh to have a television set. He manned the station when Hamish was away and was gifted with the sight.
 Shirley Henderson as Isobel Sutherland; A reporter on The Lochdubh Listener who is in love with Hamish. Hamish later realises his love for her, but their relationship remains largely unrequited. She temporarily left Lochdubh for a job in Glasgow, but later returns and starts a relationship with Hamish.
 Valerie Gogan as Alexandra "Alex" Maclean (Series 1–2); Major Maclean's daughter, a novelist who has an on/off relationship with Hamish. She breaks up with Hamish after discovering that he no longer has feelings for her, and is actually in love with Isobel. She then attempts to leave Lochdubh, but falls down a muddy cliff and dies.
 Barbara Rafferty as Agnes Meldrum; a landlady who runs the local pub with her husband, Barney. It is later revealed that when she was 16, she had a son named Gavin, whom she gave up for adoption. He later reunites with her.
 Stuart McGugan as Bernard Keir Hardy "Barney" Meldrum; the local publican, an "incomer" from Glasgow.
 Anne Lacey as Esme Murray; The local teacher and owner of the boarding house.
 Brian Pettifer as Rory Duncan Campbell; Owner of the local grocery shop, and a very close friend of Esme.
 Duncan Duff as Dougal Alexander Fleming Brown, AKA "Doc"; The kilt-wearing, pipe-smoking village doctor, who appears to smoke quantities of marijuana.
 Jimmy Yuill/Billy Riddoch as Lachlan McCrae, Sr.; A local schemer who fills his days making unlicensed sausages.
 Stuart Davids as Lachlan McCrae, Jr; Son of Lachlan Sr., who starts out in the sausage business and ends up the local undertaker.
 David Ashton as Major Roderick Peregrine ("Roddy") Maclean; Alex's father, local land-owner and former army officer.
 Zippy as Wee Jock; Hamish's dog. After Wee Jock dies, he is replaced by another dog named simply "Jock".

Recurring characters
 Jon Croft as Malkie Clunie (Series 1); The Major's groundsman and gamekeeper.
 Mona Bruce as Edith ("Edie") (Series 3); The Major's housekeeper.
 Dolina MacLennan as Flora (Series 1–2); The secretary and receptionist at the local newspaper office, and prolific knitter.
 Iain McColl as Neil (Series 2–3); Operator of the local omnibus and the small, unstaffed local railway station.
 Ronnie Letham as Peter (Series 2–3); Station Officer at the local fire station, which is run by trained locals.
 Ron Donachie as Zoot McPherrin (Series 1–2); Leader of a hippie colony, with various Lochdubh associations.
 Laurie Ventry as Reverend Alan Snow (Series 2); Local clergyman of undisclosed denomination.
 Bill Leadbitter as D.I. Willie Bruce (Series 1); Hamish's superior from the Inverness police force.
 Alex Norton as Duncan Soutar (Series 1–2); Local farmer.
 Rab Christie as Jimmy Soutar (Series 1–2); Duncan Soutar's son.
 Sandy McDade as Jean Foley (Series 3); A friend of Isobel's, who along with her nephew, Frankie, leaves Glasgow to stay in Lochdubh.
 Stephen Henderson as Frankie Bryce (Series 3); Jean's nephew, who comes with her and Isobel to stay in Lochdubh.

Episodes

Series Overview

Series 1 (1995)

Series 2 (1996)

Series 3 (1997)

Home Media
Region 1: All three series have been released on DVD in Region 1 from October 25, 2005 to October 23, 2007.

Region 2: All three series have been released on DVD in Region 2 from September 5, 2005 to April 24, 2006.

Region 4: All three series have been released on DVD in Region 4 from March 21, 2006 to February 7, 2007.

References

External links
 
 The Wee Hamish Macbeth
 Hamish Macbeth, Gossip from Lochdubh

BBC television dramas
BBC Scotland television shows
1995 Scottish television series debuts
1997 Scottish television series endings
1990s Scottish television series
English-language television shows
Television shows set in Scotland
Skye and Lochalsh
1990s British comedy-drama television series
British comedy-drama television shows
1990s British mystery television series